The Sunshine Harvester works was an Australian factory making agricultural equipment founded by industrialist H. V. McKay, and  with engineering development headed by H.B. Garde.

History

Early years
Having established an agricultural implement works in Ballarat he moved his factory and many of his employees to Braybrook Junction, in 1906, where he had earlier purchased the Braybrook Implement Works (1904). He named the new enterprise the Sunshine Harvester Works after his Sunshine Harvester, which was one of his major products. The name "Sunshine" is assumed to have been given by McKay to his harvester works after he attended a lecture by the American evangelist Reverend Thomas De Witt Talmage who visited Victoria in 1894. Another account holds that the name was suggested by James Menzies, who painted the first model.

Through a revolutionary piece of marketing, this had gained a reputation as the first successful combine harvester in Australia. The factory became the largest in the Southern Hemisphere, and, in its early stages, McKay successfully increased the concentration and efficiency of the workers: ‘between 1907 and 1910-11, McKay’s workforce expanded from just over 400 to around 1500’. McKay rapidly expanded the factory to become the largest manufacturing plant in Australia and, at its peak, it employed nearly 3,000 workers. In 1907, following a residents' petition, the locality was officially renamed Sunshine in honour of the factory. Housing for the Sunshine Harvester Works' employees swelled the local population and the town of Sunshine was touted as the "Birmingham of Australia".

The Harvester Judgement (1907)

The Sunshine Harvester Works was also the site of a protracted industrial dispute in 1907, between McKay and the unions representing the Sunshine workers. While this was based on claims for wages and conditions, McKay also argued that he should continue to receive import protection. The case was heard before H. B. Higgins at the Commonwealth Court of Conciliation and Arbitration in Melbourne between 7 October 1907 and 8 November 1907. Higgins heard evidence from employees and their wives regarding conditions at the factory and costs for supporting their families. In the Harvester Judgement, he obliged McKay to pay his employees a wage that guaranteed them a standard of living which was reasonable for "a human being in a civilised community", regardless of his capacity to pay. McKay successfully appealed this judgement, but it became the benchmark industrial decision which led to the creation of a minimum basic wage for Australian workers that dominated Australian industrial relations for the next 60 to 80 years.

The Inter-war period
By the 1920s, the company was running the largest implement factory in the southern hemisphere, and had led the international agricultural industry through the development of the world's first self-propelled harvester in 1924. At the time of McKay's death in 1926, the factory covered .  In 1930, the Canadian farm machinery manufacturer Massey Harris bought a controlling interest in H.V. McKay Pty Ltd, with the Australian operations of both firms being merged under the title H.V. McKay Massey Harris Pty Ltd. Throughout World War II, H.V. McKay Massey Harris exported 20,000 Sunshine drills, disc harrows and binders to England, to facilitate an increase in food production.

The Post-war period
In the 1950s, the McKay family sold out to the newly-formed agricultural implement conglomerate Massey Ferguson, which was a combination of the Canadian and American interests of Massey Harris, and the British tractor firm of Harry Ferguson. However, from the 1970s, when many Australian-based manufacturing industries were experiencing financial difficulties, the business progressively contracted, and most of the factory was demolished in 1992, to make way for the development of the Sunshine Marketplace.
The former bulk store, factory gates and clock tower, factory gardens, and head office complex are all listed on the Victorian Heritage Register.

The Sunshine Estate 
McKay's Sunshine Estate (now the eastern part of the suburb of Albion, part of greater Sunshine) is considered a pioneering development of a company town on the town planning principles of the Garden city movement. The principles of the Garden City movement were first developed in England by Ebenezer Howard in 1898 and re-applied in various contexts and forms.

According to The Oxford Dictionary of Human Geography, a Garden City is "a planned settlement designed to overcome the limitations of both town and country, by combining the best of both in free-standing, self-sufficient communities with ample parkland and public space."

The main correlations between Howard’s ideas and H.V. McKay’s plan for the Sunshine Estate include, firstly, the formation of a plan for a new town on undeveloped rural land (including the provision of varied infrastructure), the development of housing on spacious lots, and the establishment of a central garden for the benefit of the public. These aspects combine to present an early Australian version of a Garden City, as well as the influence of an individual on the way in which Garden City principles were applied, and the direction of town planning in Australia.

The Garden City ideal came to Australia in the 1900s and the principles played out in various ways. H.V. McKay’s development at the then town of Sunshine, 12 km from the centre of Melbourne, exemplifies this and represents an "early Australian version of the Garden City ideal". As was reported in The Burrowa News in May 1926, "Mr. McKay from the start took an active interest in Sunshine, and was lavishly spending money there to make the conditions of his employees as ideal as possible. A Garden City soon sprang up, having as its centre the great works of H.V. McKay Pty Ltd, which occupy more than 60 acres of ground, on which more than 30 are built on."

The basic principles of the Garden City movement that evidently influenced McKay include: the development of an entirely new city on rural land, the development of housing on large plots, and that the centre of town should comprise and ornamental garden surrounded by civic buildings. McKay’s plan for a model industrial town involved providing key infrastructure and services, including "electric lighting, parklands, recreation areas, public buildings, land for school and library, and housing for employees."

McKay also established the Sunshine Gardens (today called the H.V. McKay Memorial Gardens) adjacent to the factory, which was "central to his vision of a garden suburb to house a contented and respectable workforce whose life would revolve around work, church, sport, and horticulture." Bampton says ‘these gardens are a remnant of the ordered, controlled world dominated by McKay and his factory’. McKay maintained the gardens for the benefit of the community, providing for entertainment and outdoor recreation.

Furthermore, Garden City principles are evident in the employee housing on Leith Avenue – the project developed by McKay and financed through the State Savings Bank, including twenty-eight homes designed by Burridge Leith According to the Brimbank City Council, ‘the spaciousness of the lay-out of Leith Avenue suggests the influence of Garden City planning principles’. Lastly, this segment from Australian Home Builder in 1926 demonstrates the significance of Sunshine to the wider Garden City movement in Australia and the attractiveness of Garden City ideals as a means of overcoming the limitations of urban life:

Sunshine provides an interesting example of the way in which the Garden City idea filtered down to Australia, and the form in which the foundational principles were applied. H.V. McKay was, undoubtedly, an individual who had yielded influence on the manner and form in which the principles were applied and adapted to the Australian context in the early 1900s. Moreover, examination of the relationship between Garden City principles and McKay’s plan, including the early increase in industrial efficiency that the development of Sunshine facilitated, points to social and cultural changes that were occurring at the time. As such, Sunshine holds an important place in Australian industrial and planning history.

See also
 H.V. McKay Memorial Gardens

References

External links
Sunshine & District Historical Society
Friends of the H V McKay Memorial Gardens

Sunshine, Victoria
Manufacturing plants in Melbourne
Heritage-listed buildings in Melbourne
Buildings and structures demolished in 1992
Demolished buildings and structures in Melbourne
Buildings and structures in the City of Brimbank